K Velur is a village located in Vellore district, Tamil Nadu, India.

References

Villages in Vellore district